Michael Hogan (17 September 1893 – 1 January 1977) was a British screenwriter. Hogan had previously been a notable film actor, appearing in lead roles in a number of silent and early sound films. Hogan worked as a writer in both Britain and Hollywood.

Selected filmography
Actor
 Bolibar (1928)
 Ag and Bert (1929) comedy short film made in Phonofilm, directed by Bertram Phillips and co-starring Mabel Constanduros
 Windjammer (1930)
 The Lyons Mail (1931)
 Dance Pretty Lady (1932)
 The Mayor's Nest (1932)
 The Flag Lieutenant (1932)
 The Man Outside (1933)
 The River Wolves (1934)
 My Old Dutch (1934)
 The Queen's Affair (1934)
 The Last Journey (1936)

Screenwriter
 Squibs (1935)
 The Passing of the Third Floor Back (1935)
 Take My Tip (1937)
 King Solomon's Mines (1937)
 A Yank at Oxford (1938)
 Trouble Brewing (1939)
 Nurse Edith Cavell (1939)
 Secret Journey (1939)
 Rebecca (1940)
 South of Suez (1940)
 They Came by Night (1940)
 The Prime Minister (1941)
 Lady from Louisiana (1941)
 Forever and a Day (1943)
 Appointment in Berlin (1943)
 Tall in the Saddle (1944)
 Fortunes of Captain Blood (1950)

Bibliography
 Duncan, Paul. Alfred Hitchcock: Architect of Anxiety, 1899-1980. Taschen, 2003.
 Low, Rachael. History of the British Film, 1918-1929. George Allen & Unwin, 1971.

External links

1893 births
1977 deaths
British male screenwriters
British male film actors
Male actors from London
Writers from London
20th-century British male actors
British expatriates in the United States
20th-century British screenwriters